Gallery Black Swan, a now-defunct surrealist gallery in Chicago, was the site of the 1976 World Surrealist Exhibition. It later became the site of Michael Jordan's Restaurant.

References

External links
James Koehnline - Biography
Fifth Estate Review of Surrealist Subversions
http://forum.psrabel.com/portal/ausstellungen.html (German)
The Legacy Project: Visual Arts Library entry on Hiroshi Nakamura

Art museums and galleries in Chicago
Defunct art museums and galleries in the United States